Tang Sa (also Romanized as Tang Sā) is a village in Jowzar Rural District, in the Central District of Mamasani County, Fars Province, Iran. At the 2006 census, its population was 194, in 43 families.

References 

Populated places in Mamasani County